Järbo IF is a Swedish football club located in Järbo.

Background
Järbo IF currently plays in Division 4 Gestrikland which is the sixth tier of Swedish football. They play their home matches at the Järbo IP in Järbo.

The club is affiliated to Gestriklands Fotbollförbund. Järbo IF have competed in the Svenska Cupen on 15 occasions and have played 21 matches in the competition.

Season to season

Footnotes

External links
 Järbo IF – Official website

Football clubs in Gävleborg County
Association football clubs established in 1927
1927 establishments in Sweden